Mifune is a Japanese surname. Notable people with the surname include:

Toshirō Mifune (三船 敏郎) (1920–1997), Japanese actor who appeared in almost 170 feature films
Jiro Mifune (born 1972), game designer
Mifune Chizuko (御船千鶴子) (1886–1911), female clairvoyant
Mika Mifune (三船美佳) (born 1982), actress
Kyuzo Mifune (三船久蔵) (1883–1965), judoka

Fictional characters:
Captain Mifune, a character from The Matrix Revolutions
Mifune (Soul Eater), a character in the manga and anime Soul Eater
Admiral Mifune, a character from the anime The Irresponsible Captain Tylor
Go Mifune, main character in the anime series Speed Racer
Lord Mifune, a feudal ruler in Usagi Yojimbo
General Mifune, a Samurai general in Naruto

See also
Mifune, Kumamoto (御船町; -machi), town in Kamimashiki District, Kumamoto, Japan
Mifune's Last Song, a Dogme 95 film by Søren Kragh-Jacobsen

Japanese-language surnames